Everett Joseph "Vic" Firth (June 2, 1930 – July 26, 2015) was an American musician and the founder of Vic Firth Company (formerly Vic Firth, Inc.), a company that makes percussion sticks and mallets.

Biography
Vic Firth was born June 2, 1930, in Winchester, Massachusetts. He was raised in Sanford, Maine by parents Everett E. and Rosemary Firth, where he graduated from Sanford High School. Son of a successful trumpet player, he started learning the cornet at age four, turning later to percussion, trombone, clarinet, piano, and music arrangement. When he reached high school, he was a full-time percussionist, and created an 18-piece band at age 16. He played a variety of percussion instruments such as vibraphone, timpani, and the drum set. He held a Bachelor's degree, as well as an Honorary Doctorate in Music from New England Conservatory in Boston.

Firth was the principal timpanist of the Boston Symphony Orchestra from 1956 to 2002. He was the orchestra's youngest member when music director Charles Munch hired him as a percussionist in 1952.

Firth wrote several books in his career. He wrote The Solo Timpanist in 1963, followed by Marching Drums in 1964. He wrote for beginning snare drum with his Snare Drum Method Book I - Elementary  and Snare Drum Method Book II - Intermediate, published in 1967 and 1968. These books combined the concepts of orchestral snare drum technique with 30 Drum rudiments. He published the more advanced book The Solo Snare Drummer in 1968.
  
Firth died at the age of 85 on July 26, 2015, at his home in Boston, Massachusetts.

Vic Firth Company 

Founded in 1963 and headquartered in Boston, Massachusetts, the company bills itself as the world's largest manufacturer of drumsticks and mallets, which were and are made in Newport, Maine, through 2012 and 2020. In 2010, the company merged with Avedis Zildjian Company; officials said at the time that the companies would continue to run independently.

The company began when Firth, who had been performing with the Boston Symphony Orchestra for 12 years, was asked to perform pieces which he felt required a higher-quality drumstick than those that were currently being manufactured. Firth decided to design a set of his own sticks.

Firth hand-whittled the first sticks himself from bulkier sticks and sent these prototypes to a wood turner in Montreal, Quebec, Canada. The two prototypes that he sent would become the SD1 and SD2, the first two models of sticks manufactured by Vic Firth, Inc. Firth said, "It came out of necessity, not of imagination or my ability to start a company." Although the sticks were initially intended for Firth's personal use, they gained popularity among his students and were eventually carried by retailers.

As of 2012, the company offered about 300 products, and made 12 million sticks a year. The company also produced a line of pepper mills, salt grinders, and rolling pins sold under the Vic Firth Gourmet brand for many years until those interests were sold to Maine Wood Concepts of New Vineyard, Maine in 2012 and re-branded under the name Fletchers' Mill.

See also 
 List of drum manufacturers

References

External links 

 
 
Vic Firth Interview - NAMM Oral History Library (2003)

1930 births
2015 deaths
American percussionists
Manufacturing companies based in Maine
New England Conservatory alumni
People from Sanford, Maine
Percussion instrument manufacturing companies
American drummers
Timpanists
Deaths from pancreatic cancer
Deaths from cancer in Massachusetts
Musicians from Maine
20th-century American businesspeople
New England Conservatory faculty